Monocotyledon species found in Montana number at least 615. The Montana Natural Heritage Program has identified a number of monocot species as Species of Concern.

Monocotyledons are one of two major groups of flowering plants (or angiosperms) that are traditionally recognized, the other being dicotyledons, or dicots. Monocot seedlings typically have one cotyledon (seed-leaf), in contrast to the two cotyledons typical of dicots. Monocots have been recognized at various taxonomic ranks, and under various names (see below). The APG II system recognises a clade called "monocots" but does not assign it to a taxonomic rank.
There are between 50,000 and 60,000 species within this group; according to IUCN there are 59,300 species. The largest family in this group (and in the flowering plants as a whole) by number of species are the orchids (family Orchidaceae), with more than 20,000 species. In agriculture the majority of the biomass produced comes from monocots. The true grasses, family Poaceae (Gramineae), are the most economically important family in this group. These include all the true grains (rice, wheat, maize, etc.), the pasture grasses, sugar cane, and the bamboos. True grasses have evolved to become highly specialised for wind pollination. Grasses produce much smaller flowers, which are gathered in highly visible plumes (inflorescences). Other economically important monocot families are the palm family (Arecaceae), banana family (Musaceae), ginger family (Zingiberaceae) and the onion family Alliaceae, which includes such ubiquitously used vegetables as onions and garlic.

Arrow-grass family
Order: Najadales, family:  Juncaginaceae
 Common bog arrow-grass, Triglochin maritima
 Flowering quillwort, Lilaea scilloides
 Slender bog arrow-grass, Triglochin palustris

Arum family
Order: Arales, family:  Araceae
 Yellow skunk-cabbage, Lysichiton americanus

Bur-reeds
Order: Typhales, family:  Sparganiaceae
 Branching bur-reed, Sparganium androcladum
 Large bur-reed, Sparganium eurycarpum
 Narrowleaf bur-reed, Sparganium angustifolium
 Small bur-reed, Sparganium natans

Cattails
Order: Typhales, family:  Typhaceae
 Broadleaf cattail, Typha latifolia
 Narrow-leaved cattail, Typha angustifolia

Ditch-grass family
Order: Najadales, family:  Ruppiaceae
 Ditch-grass, Ruppia maritima

Duckweeds
Order: Arales, family:  Lemnaceae
 Columbia water-meal, Wolffia columbiana
 Dotted watermeal, Wolffia borealis
 Duck-meal, Spirodela polyrrhiza
 Lesser duckweed, Lemna minor
 Pale duckweed, Lemna valdiviana
 Spotted water-meal, Wolffia brasiliensis
 Star duckweed, Lemna trisulca
 Turion duckweed, Lemna turionifera

Flowering-rush family
Order: Alismatales, family:  Butomaceae
 Flowering-rush, Butomus umbellatus

Grasses
Order: Cyperales, family:  Poaceae
 Alaskan oniongrass, Melica subulata
 Alkali cordgrass, Spartina gracilis
 Alkali muhly, Muhlenbergia asperifolia
 Alkali sacaton, Sporobolus airoides
 Alpine bluegrass, Poa alpina
 American mannagrass, Glyceria grandis
 American sloughgrass, Beckmannia syzigachne
 Annual bluegrass, Poa annua
 Annual false wheatgrass, Eremopyrum triticeum
 Annual hairgrass, Deschampsia danthonioides
 Annual muhly, Muhlenbergia minutissima
 Arctic bluegrass, Poa arctica
 Awnless wild rye, Elymus submuticus
 Baffin fescue, Festuca baffinensis
 Banff loose-flowered bluegrass, Poa laxa ssp. banffiana
 Barnyard grass, Echinochloa crus-galli
 Basin brome, Bromus polyanthus
 Beardless oats, Trisetum wolfii
 Beardless wild rye, Leymus triticoides
 Bermudagrass, Cynodon dactylon
 Big bluestem, Andropogon gerardii
 Blue grama, Bouteloua gracilis
 Blue wild rye, Elymus glaucus
 Blue-joint reedgrass, Calamagrostis canadensis
 Bluebunch wheatgrass, Pseudoroegneria spicata
 Bog bluegrass, Poa leptocoma
 Boreal mannagrass, Glyceria borealis
 Bottlebrush squirrel-tail, Elymus elymoides
 Bristly bristle grass, Setaria verticillata
 Bristly dogtail grass, Cynosurus echinatus
 Broad-glumed brome, Bromus latiglumis
 Brome fescue, Vulpia bromoides
 Brook grass, Catabrosa aquatica
 Buffalo grass, Bouteloua dactyloides
 Bulbous bluegrass, Poa bulbosa
 California brome, Bromus carinatus
 California oatgrass, Danthonia californica
 Canada bluegrass, Poa compressa
 Canada wild rye, Elymus canadensis
 Cascade reedgrass, Calamagrostis tweedyi
 Cheatgrass, Bromus tectorum
 Chilean brome, Bromus berteroanus
 Colonial bentgrass, Agrostis capillaris
 Columbia needlegrass, Stipa nelsonii ssp. dorei
 Common barley, Hordeum vulgare
 Common canary grass, Phalaris canariensis
 Common hardgrass, Sclerochloa dura
 Common reed, Phragmites australis
 Common velvetgrass, Holcus lanatus
 Contracted Indian ricegrass, Oryzopsis contracta
 Corn brome, Bromus squarrosus
 Creeping foxtail, Alopecurus arundinaceus
 Crested dogtail grass, Cynosurus cristatus
 Crested wheatgrass, Agropyron cristatum
 Cultivated oat, Avena sativa
 Cultivated rye, Secale cereale
 Cultivated wheat, Triticum aestivum
 Cusick's bluegrass, Poa cusickii
 Darnel ryegrass, Lolium temulentum
 Dense pine reedgrass, Calamagrostis koelerioides
 Dense silky bentgrass, Apera interrupta
 Ditch reedgrass, Calamagrostis scopulorum
 Drooping woodreed, Cinna latifolia
 Eastern wild rice, Zizania aquatica
 False buffalograss, Monroa squarrosa
 Few-flowered oatgrass, Danthonia unispicata
 Few-flowered panic-grass, Dichanthelium oligosanthes
 Field brome, Bromus arvensis
 Fowl bluegrass, Poa palustris
 Fowl mannagrass, Glyceria striata
 Fox-tail timothy, Crypsis alopecuroides
 Foxtail barley, Hordeum jubatum
 Foxtail fescue, Vulpia myuros
 Foxtail muhly, Muhlenbergia andina
 Fringed brome, Bromus ciliatus
 Great Basin wild rye, Leymus cinereus
 Green bristle grass, Setaria viridis
 Green needlegrass, Stipa viridula
 Hairy crabgrass, Digitaria sanguinalis
 Ice grass, Phippsia algida
 Idaho bentgrass, Agrostis idahoensis
 Idaho fescue, Festuca idahoensis
 Indian goosegrass, Eleusine indica
 Indian ricegrass, Oryzopsis hymenoides
 Indiangrass, Sorghastrum nutans
 Inland bluegrass, Poa interior
 Intermediate wheatgrass, Thinopyrum intermedium
 Italian foxtail, Setaria italica
 Italian ryegrass, Lolium multiflorum
 Japanese brome, Bromus japonicus
 Johnson grass, Sorghum halepense
 Jointed goatgrass, Aegilops cylindrica
 Kentucky bluegrass, Poa pratensis
 Leafy bentgrass, Agrostis pallens
 Lemmon's alkaligrass, Puccinellia lemmonii
 Lemmon's needlegrass, Stipa lemmonii
 Letterman's bluegrass, Poa lettermanii
 Letterman's needlegrass, Stipa lettermanii
 Little barley, Hordeum pusillum
 Little bluestem, Schizachyrium scoparium
 Little lovegrass, Eragrostis minor
 Little ricegrass, Oryzopsis exigua
 Littleseed ricegrass, Oryzopsis micrantha
 Long-spine sandbur, Cenchrus longispinus
 Marsh muhly, Muhlenbergia racemosa
 Mat muhly, Muhlenbergia richardsonis
 Meadow barley, Hordeum brachyantherum
 Meadow fescue, Festuca pratensis
 Meadow foxtail, Alopecurus geniculatus
 Meadow foxtail, Alopecurus pratensis
 Meadow timothy, Phleum pratense
 Mediterranean or sea barley, Hordeum marinum
 Missoula County oats, Trisetum x orthochaetum
 Montana wheatgrass, Elymus albicans
 Mountain bentgrass, Agrostis humilis
 Mountain fescue, Festuca viridula
 Mountain foxtail, Alopecurus alpinus
 Mountain hairgrass, Vahlodea atropurpurea
 Mountain muhly, Muhlenbergia montana
 Mountain timothy, Phleum alpinum
 Mouse barley, Hordeum murinum
 Mt. Washington bluegrass, Poa laxa
 Muttongrass, Poa fendleriana
 Narrow false oats, Trisetum spicatum
 Narrow-flower bluegrass, Poa stenantha
 Narrow-flowered brome, Bromus vulgaris
 Needle-and-thread, Stipa comata
 Nelson's needlegrass, Stipa nelsonii
 Nevada needlegrass, Stipa nevadensis
 Nodding bluegrass, Poa reflexa
 Nodding fescue, Festuca subulata
 Nodding trisetum, Trisetum canescens
 Northern bentgrass, Agrostis borealis
 Northern fescue, Festuca viviparoidea
 Northern sweet grass, Hierochloe hirta
 Northern wild rye, Leymus innovatus
 Nuttall's alkali grass, Puccinellia nuttalliana
 Oniongrass, Melica bulbosa
 Orchard grass, Dactylis glomerata
 Oregon bentgrass, Agrostis oregonensis
 Pale manna grass, Puccinellia pauciflora
 Panic grass, Dichanthelium acuminatum
 Parry's oatgrass, Danthonia parryi
 Patterson's bluegrass, Poa abbreviata ssp. pattersonii
 Perennial ryegrass, Lolium perenne
 Persian ryegrass, Lolium persicum
 Pineforest needlegrass, Stipa pinetorum
 Pinegrass, Calamagrostis rubescens
 Plains muhly, Muhlenbergia cuspidata
 Plains reedgrass, Calamagrostis montanensis
 Plains rough fescue, Festuca hallii
 Porcupine needlegrass, Stipa spartea
 Porter's brome, Bromus porteri
 Poverty oatgrass, Danthonia spicata
 Prairie bluegrass, Poa arida
 Prairie cordgrass, Spartina pectinata
 Prairie dropseed, Sporobolus heterolepis
 Prairie junegrass, Koeleria macrantha
 Prairie sandreed, Calamovilfa longifolia
 Prairie wedgegrass, Sphenopholis obtusata
 Proso millet, Panicum miliaceum
 Pullup muhly, Muhlenbergia filiformis
 Pumpelly's brome, Bromus inermis ssp. pumpellianus
 Purple lovegrass, Eragrostis pectinacea
 Purple oat, Schizachne purpurascens
 Purple reedgrass, Calamagrostis purpurascens
 Purple three-awn grass, Aristida purpurea
 Quackgrass, Elymus repens
 Rabbit's-foot grass, Polypogon monspeliensis
 Rattlesnake brome, Bromus briziformis
 Red fescue, Festuca rubra
 Redtop, Agrostis stolonifera
 Reed canary grass, Phalaris arundinacea
 Rice cutgrass, Leersia oryzoides
 Richardson's needlegrass, Stipa richardsonii
 Rocky Mountain fescue, Festuca saximontana
 Rough barnyard grass, Echinochloa muricata
 Rough bentgrass, Agrostis scabra
 Rough bluegrass, Poa trivialis
 Rough fescue, Festuca scabrella
 Roughleaf ricegrass, Oryzopsis asperifolia
 Russian wild rye, Psathyrostachys juncea
 Rye brome, Bromus secalinus
 Saltgrass, Distichlis spicata
 Sand bluestem, Andropogon hallii
 Sand dropseed, Sporobolus cryptandrus
 Sand wild rye, Leymus flavescens
 Sandberg bluegrass, Poa secunda
 Scribner's panic grass, Dichanthelium oligosanthes var. scribnerianum
 Scribner's wild rye, Elymus scribneri
 Sheathed dropseed, Sporobolus vaginiflorus
 Sheep fescue, Festuca ovina
 Short-awn foxtail, Alopecurus aequalis
 Short-leaved bluegrass, Poa arnowiae
 Shortleaf fescue, Festuca brachyphylla
 Showy oniongrass, Melica spectabilis
 Side-oats grama, Bouteloua curtipendula
 Six-weeks grama, Bouteloua barbata
 Six-weeks fescue, Vulpia octoflora
 Slender hairgrass, Deschampsia elongata
 Slender oat, Avena barbata
 Slender wedgegrass, Sphenopholis intermedia
 Slender wheatgrass, Elymus trachycaulus
 Slimstem reedgrass, Calamagrostis stricta
 Small dropseed, Sporobolus neglectus
 Small six-weeks fescue, Vulpia microstachys
 Smallflower fescue, Festuca minutiflora
 Smith's melicgrass, Melica smithii
 Smooth brome, Bromus inermis ssp. inermis
 Smooth crabgrass, Digitaria ischaemum
 Soft brome, Bromus hordeaceus
 Spike bentgrass, Agrostis exarata
 Spike fescue, Leucopoa kingii
 Spike muhly, Muhlenbergia glomerata
 Spike-oat, Helictotrichon hookeri
 Spiked brome, Bromus racemosus
 Sprangletop, Leptochloa fusca
 Sprangletop, Scolochloa festucacea
 Spreading alkali grass, Puccinellia distans
 Stinkgrass, Eragrostis cilianensis
 Stout wood reed-grass, Cinna arundinacea
 Sweet vernalgrass, Anthoxanthum odoratum
 Switchgrass, Panicum virgatum
 Tall dropseed, Sporobolus compositus
 Tall fescue, Festuca arundinacea
 Tall mannagrass, Glyceria elata
 Tall oatgrass, Arrhenatherum elatius
 Tall trisetum, Trisetum cernuum
 Teal lovegrass, Eragrostis hypnoides
 Thickspike wheatgrass, Elymus lanceolatus
 Thurber's bentgrass, Agrostis thurberiana
 Thurber's needlegrass, Stipa thurberiana
 Timber oatgrass, Danthonia intermedia
 Tufted foxtail, Alopecurus carolinianus
 Tufted hairgrass, Deschampsia cespitosa
 Tumble grass, Schedonnardus paniculatus
 Variable bentgrass, Agrostis variabilis
 Virginia wild rye, Elymus virginicus
 Western fescue, Festuca occidentalis
 Western needlegrass, Stipa occidentalis
 Western porcupine grass, Stipa curtiseta
 Western wheatgrass, Pascopyrum smithii
 Wheeler's bluegrass, Poa wheeleri
 White bluegrass, Poa glauca
 Wilcox's panic grass, Dichanthelium wilcoxianum
 Wild oats, Avena fatua
 Wirestem muhly, Muhlenbergia mexicana
 Witch panicgrass, Panicum capillare
 Yellow bluestem, Bothriochloa ischaemum
 Yellow foxtail, Setaria pumila

Greenbriars
Order: Liliales, family:  Smilacaceae
 Herbaceous greenbrier, Smilax lasioneura

Horned pondweeds
Order: Najadales, family:  Zannichelliaceae
 Horned pondweed, Zannichellia palustris

Irises
Order: Liliales, family:  Iridaceae
 Idaho blue-eyed-grass, Sisyrinchium idahoense
 Northern blue-eyed-grass, Sisyrinchium septentrionale
 Strict blue-eyed-grass, Sisyrinchium montanum
 Western blue iris, Iris missouriensis
 Western blue-eyed-grass, Sisyrinchium halophilum
 Yellow iris, Iris pseudacorus

Lilies
Order: Liliales, family:  Liliaceae
 American false-hellebore, Veratrum viride
 Baker mariposa lily, Calochortus apiculatus
 Beargrass, Xerophyllum tenax
 Big-pod mariposa lily, Calochortus eurycarpus
 Brandegee's onion, Allium brandegeei
 Bruneau mariposa lily, Calochortus bruneaunis
 California false-hellebore, Veratrum californicum
 Chives, Allium schoenoprasum
 Chocolate lily, Fritillaria atropurpurea
 Clasping twisted-stalk, Streptopus amplexifolius
 Columbia lily, Lilium columbianum
 Columbia onion, Allium columbianum
 Common alpine-lily, Lloydia serotina
 Common camas, Camassia quamash
 Dwarf onion, Allium simillimum
 Elegant mariposa lily, Calochortus elegans
 False Solomon's-seal, Maianthemum racemosum
 Foothill death camas, Zigadenus paniculatus
 Fringed onion, Allium fibrillum
 Garden asparagus, Asparagus officinalis
 Geyer's bulbil onion, Allium geyeri var. tenerum
 Geyer's onion, Allium geyeri
 Glacier lily, Erythronium grandiflorum
 Green-band mariposa lily, Calochortus macrocarpus
 Gunnison's mariposa lily, Calochortus gunnisonii
 Hooker's fairybells, Prosartes hookeri
 Large-flower triteleia, Triteleia grandiflora
 Meadow death camas, Zigadenus venenosus
 Meadow onion, Allium canadense
 Mountain death camas, Zigadenus elegans
 Mountain star-lily, Leucocrinum montanum
 Nodding onion, Allium cernuum
 Nuttall's mariposa lily, Calochortus nuttallii
 Orange daylily, Hemerocallis fulva
 Queencup bead lily, Clintonia uniflora
 Rosy twisted-stalk, Streptopus lanceolatus
 Rough-fruited fairybells, Prosartes trachycarpa
 Short-stem onion, Allium brevistylum
 Small onion, Allium parvum
 Small tofieldia, Tofieldia pusilla
 Starry false Solomon's-seal, Maianthemum stellatum
 Tapertip onion, Allium acuminatum
 Three-leaf false Solomon's-seal, Maianthemum trifolium
 Western false asphodel, Triantha occidentalis
 Western featherbells, Stenanthium occidentale
 Western trillium, Trillium ovatum
 White glacier lily, Erythronium grandiflorum var. candidum
 White wild onion, Allium textile
 Wild lily-of-the-valley, Maianthemum canadense
 Wood lily, Lilium philadelphicum
 Yellowbells, Fritillaria pudica

Orchids
Order: Orchidales, family:  Orchidaceae
 Alaska rein orchid, Piperia unalascensis
 Broad-leaved twayblade, Neottia convallarioides
 Clustered lady's-slipper, Cypripedium fasciculatum
 Early coralroot, Corallorhiza trifida
 Eastern helleborine, Epipactis helleborine
 Fairy slipper, Calypso bulbosa
 Giant helleborine, Epipactis gigantea
 Giant rattlesnake-plantain, Goodyera oblongifolia
 Heartleaf twayblade, Neottia cordata
 Hillside rein orchid, Piperia elegans
 Hooded ladies'-tresses, Spiranthes romanzoffiana
 Huron green orchid, Platanthera huronensis
 Hybrid lady's-slipper, Cypripedium x columbianum
 Large roundleaf orchid, Platanthera orbiculata
 Loesel's twayblade, Liparis loeselii
 Long-bract green orchis, Coeloglossum viride
 Mertens' coralroot, Corallorhiza mertensiana
 Mountain lady's-slipper, Cypripedium montanum
 Northern green orchid, Platanthera aquilonis
 Northern rattlesnake-plantain, Goodyera repens
 Northern twayblade, Neottia borealis
 Round-leaved orchis, Amerorchis rotundifolia
 Slender bog orchid, Platanthera stricta
 Small northern bog orchid, Platanthera obtusata
 Small yellow lady's-slipper, Cypripedium parviflorum
 Sparrow's-egg lady's-slipper, Cypripedium passerinum
 Spotted coralroot, Corallorhiza maculata
 Spring coralroot, Corallorhiza wisteriana
 Striped coralroot, Corallorhiza striata
 Ute ladies'-tresses, Spiranthes diluvialis
 Western twayblade, Neottia banksiana
 White bog orchid, Platanthera dilatata

Pod-grasses
Order: Najadales, family:  Scheuchzeriaceae
 Pod grass, Scheuchzeria palustris

Pondweeds
Order: Najadales, family:  Potamogetonaceae
 Blunt-leaved pondweed, Potamogeton obtusifolius
 Curly pondweed, Potamogeton crispus
 Flatleaf pondweed, Potamogeton robbinsii
 Flatstem pondweed, Potamogeton compressus
 Floating pondweed, Potamogeton natans
 Fries' pondweed, Potamogeton friesii
 Grassy pondweed, Potamogeton gramineus
 Illinois pondweed, Potamogeton illinoensis
 Largeleaf pondweed, Potamogeton amplifolius
 Leafy pondweed, Potamogeton foliosus
 Longleaf pondweed, Potamogeton nodosus
 Northern pondweed, Potamogeton alpinus
 Nuttall's pondweed, Potamogeton epihydrus
 Richardson's pondweed, Potamogeton richardsonii
 Sago pondweed, Stuckenia pectinata
 Sheathed pondweed, Stuckenia vaginata
 Slender pondweed, Stuckenia filiformis
 Slender pondweed, Potamogeton pusillus
 Straightleaf pondweed, Potamogeton strictifolius
 Water-thread pondweed, Potamogeton diversifolius
 White-stem pondweed, Potamogeton praelongus

Rushes
Order: Juncales, family:  Juncaceae
 Baltic rush, Juncus balticus
 Black-grass rush, Juncus gerardii
 Chestnut rush, Juncus castaneus
 Colorado rush, Juncus confusus
 Common woodrush, Luzula multiflora
 Coville's rush, Juncus covillei
 Curved woodrush, Luzula arcuata
 Drummond's rush, Juncus drummondii
 Dudley's rush, Juncus dudleyi
 Flattened rush, Juncus compressus
 Forked woodrush, Luzula divaricata
 Hall's rush, Juncus hallii
 Inland rush, Juncus interior
 Jointed rush, Juncus articulatus
 Knotted rush, Juncus nodosus
 Long-styled rush, Juncus longistylis
 Mertens' rush, Juncus mertensianus
 Nevada rush, Juncus nevadensis
 Northern green rush, Juncus alpinoarticulatus
 Parry's rush, Juncus parryi
 Piper's woodrush, Luzula piperi
 Regel's rush, Juncus regelii
 Slender rush, Juncus tenuis
 Small-flower woodrush, Luzula parviflora
 Smooth woodrush, Luzula hitchcockii
 Soft rush, Juncus effusus
 Spiked woodrush, Luzula spicata
 Straight-leaf rush, Juncus orthophyllus
 Tapered rush, Juncus acuminatus
 Thread rush, Juncus filiformis
 Three-flowered rush, Juncus albescens
 Three-flowered rush, Juncus triglumis
 Three-stamened rush, Juncus ensifolius
 Toad rush, Juncus bufonius
 Torrey's rush, Juncus torreyi
 Two-flowered rush, Juncus biglumis
 Vasey's rush, Juncus vaseyi

Sedges
Order: Cyperales, family:  Cyperaceae

 Alpine nerved sedge, Carex neurophora
 Alpine sedge, Carex glacialis
 Arctic hare's-foot sedge, Carex lachenalii
 Awl-fruit sedge, Carex stipata
 Awned sedge, Carex atherodes
 Beaked spikerush, Eleocharis rostellata
 Bearded flatsedge, Cyperus squarrosus
 Beautiful sedge, Carex concinna
 Bebb's sedge, Carex bebbii
 Big-leaf sedge, Carex amplifolia
 Black alpine sedge, Carex nigricans
 Black and purple sedge, Carex luzulina var. atropurpurea
 Black-and-white scale sedge, Carex albonigra
 Black-girdle bulrush, Scirpus atrocinctus
 Blackened sedge, Carex atrosquama
 Blackroot sedge, Carex elynoides
 Blunt sedge, Carex obtusata
 Bolander's sedge, Carex bolanderi
 Bristly sedge, Carex comosa
 Bristly-stalk sedge, Carex leptalea
 Bronze sedge, Carex aenea
 Brownish sedge, Carex brunnescens
 Bulrush sedge, Carex scirpoidea
 Buxbaum's sedge, Carex buxbaumii
 Capitate sedge, Carex capitata
 Clustered field sedge, Carex praegracilis
 Coastal sand sedge, Carex incurviformis
 Columbian sedge, Carex aperta
 Common beaked sedge, Carex utriculata
 Copper-scale sedge, Carex chalciolepis
 Copycat sedge, Carex simulata
 Cordilleran sedge, Carex cordillerana
 Crawe's sedge, Carex crawei
 Crawford's sedge, Carex crawfordii
 Creeping sedge, Carex chordorrhiza
 Creeping spikerush, Eleocharis palustris
 Cusick's sedge, Carex cusickii
 Delicate spikerush, Eleocharis bella
 Different-nerve sedge, Carex epapillosa
 Douglas' sedge, Carex douglasii
 Drummond's halfchaff sedge, Lipocarpha drummondii
 Dry-spike sedge, Carex foenea
 Dusky-seed sedge, Carex pelocarpa
 Ebony sedge, Carex ebenea
 Engelmann's sedge, Carex engelmannii
 Falkland Island sedge, Carex macloviana
 Fescue sedge, Carex brevior
 Few-flower spikerush, Eleocharis quinqueflora
 Few-seeded bog sedge, Carex microglochin
 Fox sedge, Carex vulpinoidea
 Geyer's sedge, Carex geyeri
 Glaucous beaked sedge, Carex rostrata
 Golden-fruit sedge, Carex aurea
 Goose-grass sedge, Carex lenticularis var. dolia
 Goosegrass sedge, Carex eleusinoides
 Green-keeled cottongrass, Eriophorum viridicarinatum
 Hair-like sedge, Carex capillaris
 Hall's sedge, Carex hallii
 Hardstem bulrush, Schoenoplectus acutus
 Hayden's sedge, Carex haydeniana
 Hoary sedge, Carex canescens
 Holm's Rocky Mountain sedge, Carex scopulorum
 Hood's sedge, Carex hoodii
 Hudson's bay bulrush, Trichophorum alpinum
 Idaho sedge, Carex idahoa
 Inflated sedge, Carex vesicaria
 Inland sedge, Carex interior
 Intermediate sedge, Carex media
 Ivory sedge, Carex eburnea
 Jointed-spike sedge, Carex athrostachya
 Jones' sedge, Carex jonesii
 Lake-bank sedge, Carex lacustris
 Large-fruited kobresia, Kobresia sibirica
 Least spikerush, Eleocharis acicularis
 Lesser panicled sedge, Carex diandra
 Liddon sedge, Carex petasata
 Little green sedge, Carex viridula
 Little prickly sedge, Carex echinata
 Long-stolon sedge, Carex inops
 Longbeak sedge, Carex sprengelii
 Many-headed sedge, Carex sychnocephala
 Many-ribbed sedge, Carex multicostata
 Mertens' sedge, Carex mertensii
 Mountain hare sedge, Carex phaeocephala
 Mountain sedge, Carex scopulorum var. bracteosa
 Mt. Shasta sedge, Carex straminiformis
 Mud sedge, Carex limosa
 Nard sedge, Carex nardina
 Narrow sedge, Carex angustata
 Narrowleaf cottongrass, Eriophorum angustifolium
 Nebraska sedge, Carex nebrascensis
 Needleleaf sedge, Carex duriuscula
 Nelson's sedge, Carex nelsonii
 Nevada bulrush, Scirpus nevadensis
 Northern bog sedge, Carex gynocrates
 Northern clustered sedge, Carex arcta
 Northern meadow sedge, Carex praticola
 Northern singlespike sedge, Carex scirpoidea ssp. scirpoidea
 Northwestern sedge, Carex concinnoides
 Northwestern showy sedge, Carex spectabilis
 Ovate spikerush, Eleocharis ovata
 Pacific kobresia, Kobresia myosuroides
 Pale bulrush, Scirpus pallidus
 Pale sedge, Carex livida
 Pale spikerush, Eleocharis flavescens
 Palish sedge, Carex pallescens
 Parry's sedge, Carex parryana
 Payson's sedge, Carex paysonis
 Pendulous bulrush, Scirpus pendulus
 Pointed broom sedge, Carex scoparia
 Poor sedge, Carex magellanica
 Porcupine sedge, Carex hystericina
 Prairie sedge, Carex prairea
 Pregnant sedge, Carex gravida
 Presl sedge, Carex preslii
 Purple spikerush, Eleocharis atropurpurea
 Pyrenean sedge, Carex pyrenaica
 Raynolds' sedge, Carex raynoldsii
 Red-root flatsedge, Cyperus erythrorhizos
 Retrorse sedge, Carex retrorsa
 River bulrush, Schoenoplectus fluviatilis
 Rock sedge, Carex petricosa
 Rock sedge, Carex rupestris
 Rocky Mountain sedge, Carex backii
 Rocky Mountain sedge, Carex saximontana
 Rolland's bulrush, Trichophorum pumilum
 Russet cottongrass, Eriophorum chamissonis
 Russet sedge, Carex saxatilis
 Rusty sedge, Carex subfusca
 Saltmarsh bulrush, Bolboschoenus maritimus
 Sartwell's sedge, Carex sartwellii
 Saw-leaved sedge, Carex scopulorum var. prionophylla
 Scheuchzer cottongrass, Eriophorum scheuchzeri
 Schweinitz' flatsedge, Cyperus schweinitzii
 Sedge (unnamed), Carex diluta
 Sheathed cottongrass, Eriophorum callitrix
 Sheathed sedge, Carex vaginata
 Shining flatsedge, Cyperus bipartitus
 Shore sedge, Carex lenticularis
 Shore sedge, Carex lenticularis var. lipocarpa
 Short sedge, Carex rossii
 Short-leaf sedge, Carex fuliginosa
 Short-pointed flatsedge, Cyperus acuminatus
 Short-scale sedge, Carex deweyana
 Short-scaled sedge, Carex leptopoda
 Short-stalk sedge, Carex podocarpa
 Short-stemmed sedge, Carex deflexa
 Sierran hare sedge, Carex leporinella
 Simple kobresia, Kobresia simpliciuscula
 Slender bulrush, Schoenoplectus heterochaetus
 Slender cottongrass, Eriophorum gracile
 Slender sedge, Carex lasiocarpa
 Slender spikerush, Eleocharis elliptica
 Small-fruit bulrush, Scirpus microcarpus
 Small-head sedge, Carex illota
 Small-wing sedge, Carex microptera
 Small-winged sedge, Carex stenoptila
 Smooth-cone sedge, Carex laeviconica
 Smooth-stem sedge, Carex laeviculmis
 Soft sedge, Carex tenera
 Softleaf sedge, Carex disperma
 Softstem bulrush, Schoenoplectus tabernaemontani
 Steven's Scandinavian sedge, Carex stevenii
 Teacher's sedge, Carex praeceptorum
 Thick-head sedge, Carex pachystachya
 Thin-flowered sedge, Carex tenuiflora
 Thread-leaved sedge, Carex filifolia
 Threadleaf beakseed, Bulbostylis capillaris
 Three-square bulrush, Schoenoplectus americanus
 Three-square bulrush, Schoenoplectus pungens
 Threeway sedge, Dulichium arundinaceum
 Torrey's sedge, Carex torreyi
 Tufted club-rush, Trichophorum cespitosum
 Valley sedge, Carex vallicola
 Water bulrush, Schoenoplectus subterminalis
 Water sedge, Carex aquatilis
 Western sedge, Carex occidentalis
 Western single-spike sedge, Carex scirpoidea ssp. pseudoscirpoidea
 White-scaled sedge, Carex xerantica
 Woodrush sedge, Carex luzulina
 Woodrush sedge, Carex luzulina var. ablata
 Woolgrass, Scirpus cyperinus
 Woolgrass bulrush, Scirpus atrovirens
 Woolly sedge, Carex pellita
 Yellow sedge, Carex flava

Spiderwort family
Order: Commelinales, family:  Commelinaceae
 Bracted spiderwort, Tradescantia bracteata
 Prairie spiderwort, Tradescantia occidentalis

Sweetflag / calamus family
Order: Arales, family:  Acoraceae
 Sweetflag, Acorus americanus

Water-hyacinth family
Order: Liliales, family:  Pontederiaceae
 Water star-grass, Heteranthera dubia

Water-nymph family
Order: Najadales, family:  Najadaceae
 Guadalupe water-nymph, Najas guadalupensis
 Slender naiad, Najas flexilis

Water-plantains
Order: Alismatales, family:  Alismataceae
 Common arrowhead, Sagittaria latifolia
 Narrow-leaf water-plantain, Alisma gramineum
 Northern arrowhead, Sagittaria cuneata
 Northern water-plantain, Alisma triviale

Waterweeds
Order: Hydrocharitales, family:  Hydrocharitaceae
 Broad waterweed, Elodea canadensis
 Long-sheath waterweed, Elodea bifoliata
 Nuttall waterweed, Elodea nuttallii

Yuccas / agaves
Order: Liliales, family:  Agavaceae
 Small soapweed yucca, Yucca glauca

Further reading

See also
 Coniferous plants of Montana
 Lichens of Montana
 Dicotyledons of Montana

Notes

Monocotlydeons
Montana
.Montana